Ray Charles (born Charles Raymond Offenberg; September 13, 1918April 6, 2015) was an American musician, singer, songwriter, vocal arranger and conductor who was best known as organizer and leader of the Ray Charles Singers who were featured on Perry Como's records and television shows for 35 years and were also known for a series of 30 choral record albums produced in the 1950s and 1960s for the Essex, MGM, Decca and Command labels.

As a vocalist, Charles, along with Julia Rinker Miller, sang the theme song to the television series Three's Company ("Come and Knock on Our Door"). As a songwriter, Charles was best known for the choral anthem "Fifty Nifty United States" in which he set the names of the states to music in alphabetical order. It was originally written for The Perry Como Show. He is also known for "Letters, We Get Letters", also originally written for Como's show and later used on the Late Show with David Letterman.

In his later years, he continued to serve as a musical consultant to television programs, most notably for 31 years on the Kennedy Center Honors. Charles was acknowledged as an authority on American popular music.

Biography 
At the age of 13, Charles Raymond "Chuck" Offenberg (as he was known then) won a contest to sing on the radio in Chicago. At 16, while still at Hyde Park High School, he had his own 15minute radio program on WENR and won a vocal scholarship to the Chicago Musical College. After graduation, he attended Central YMCA College, where he met fellow future choral director Norman Luboff, who was to become a lifelong friend. In 1936, Offenberg joined the Federal Theater show O Say Can You Sing, sharing a dressing room with the young Buddy Rich. In 1942, Offenberg, with his wife, Bernice and son, Michael, came to New York City and he started getting work, singing on the radio for Lyn Murray, Ray Bloch and other choral directors.

By 1944, he was doing 10 radio shows a week. At this time, close harmony singing was popular, and Charles became the arranger and tenor for the Double Daters, a vocal quartet featured on Million Dollar Band.

In May 1944, Offenberg changed his name to Ray Charles. This was several years before the rhythm and blues singer Ray Charles first recorded under the same name in the early 1950s. Drafted into the Navy in 1944, Charles was assigned to Hunter College, where he created an entire new music library for the WAVE choruses and trained the "Singing Platoons", three choruses of 80 WAVES each, on six-week training cycles that sang on the radio, bond rallies and at local veterans hospitals. He also conducted the band on their two CBS weekly shows.

Discharged in 1946, Charles sang on New York radio ("Um Um Good" for Campbell's soups among other gigs) and on many record dates. In 1947, he was the conductor for the Broadway hit Finian's Rainbow, and conducted the original cast recording. Charles initially became associated with Perry Como in 1948 through his arrangements for the vocal group the Satisfiers.  The group performed on Como's The Chesterfield Supper Club. From 1949 to 1951, he was choral arranger-conductor on The Big Show, the last big radio variety show with Tallulah Bankhead and Meredith Willson. Charles was also a soloist and sang in the choir on Manhattan Merry-Go-Round, Tuesday on Broadway, The Prudential Family Hour, The Celenese Hour, The Schafer Beer Program and The American Melody Hour, and he wrote the theme for Danny Kaye's 7-Up Radio Show.

Early television 
Before its relocation to Los Angeles, Charles did some singing on the radio show, Your Hit Parade. In 1950, when the show returned to New York, he became the arranger and conductor of the Hit Paraders, the choral group on the show, first on radio and later when it went to television, for seven years. Charles never got screen credit for his work as arranger and choral director of the Hit Paraders because the sponsor of Your Hit Parade was Lucky Strike and he was already getting a choral-director credit on The Perry Como Chesterfield Show. Lucky Strike and Chesterfield were competitors and Como's Chesterfield show aired three times a week on CBS.

For the next 35 years the Ray Charles Singers became a fixture on the Perry Como television show. It was a busy time with television's top variety shows, records and commercial jingles. In 1955, the 15-minute Perry Como Show moved back to NBC and became an hour-long program. It was here where he met the "other" Ray Charles. The Screen Actors Guild normally does not allow two members to have the same name, but Charles the performer was registered as Ray Robinson though he performed as Ray Charles. Charles the composer also wrote special material and did the choral work on Caesar's Hour with Sid Caesar, the successor to Your Show of Shows. In 1959, Charles produced the summer replacement for The Perry Como Show. Allan Sherman ("Hello Muddah, Hello Fadduh"), a friend of Charles', was the head writer. Also on the staff was Andy Rooney. The stars were Tony Bennett (his first series), Teresa Brewer and the Four Lads.

The Ray Charles Singers 
In June 1959, the Ray Charles Singers, a name bestowed on them by Perry Como, began recording a series of albums. Due to advances in recording technology, they were able to create a softer sound than had been heard before and this was the birth of what has been called "easy listening".  Record producer Jack Hansen used some of the singers to provide backing vocals for Buddy Holly's last songs, which Holly had composed and recorded shortly before his death in February 1959. The singers' close harmonies behind Holly's lead vocals simulated the sound of Holly's hit records with the Crickets. Six songs resulted from the Hansen sessions, led by the 45-rpm single "Peggy Sue Got Married"/"Crying, Waiting, Hoping".

On a cruise in 1964, Charles heard a Mexican song called "Cuando Calienta el Sol". He liked it, recorded it, under the English title "Love Me with All Your Heart", and his recording became a hit, riding to No. 3 on Billboard, #2 on Cashbox. This was followed by "Al Di La", also a very popular recording. The Ray Charles Singers were not one group of vocalists. They were different combinations of singers on records, tours and TV shows. What made them the Ray Charles Singers was the conducting and arranging of Ray Charles. He generally recorded with 20 singers (12 men and eight women) and these vocalists appeared on Perry Como's television show. The Ray Charles Singers also were the voices behind many commercial jingles.

Charles decided to produce a "live" performing group to send on the road with Perry Como. The group of 12 singers opened in Las Vegas at the International Hotel and also opened the show for Como at Harrah's in South Lake Tahoe.

Charles wrote the music and lyrics for an album produced by the Continental Insurance Company for the New York World's Fair in 1964, titled Cinema '76. It was a companion piece to a 30-minute show about unsung heroes of the American Revolution.

Films 
Charles had also worked on film projects: Funny Lady and Racing With the Moon.

West Coast television 
After years working in television and writing hundreds of jingles, Charles started making trips to the West Coast to seek new employment opportunities. The television industry was changing and migrating to Los Angeles. After a couple of years commuting, in 1968 Charles and his family relocated to Los Angeles, where he produced a Bing Crosby special and worked on The Hollywood Palace. By 1968, The Perry Como Show was doing specials, so Charles could continue working with Como while residing in California. Then Charles wrote and arranged for two seasons of the Glen Campbell Goodtime Hour. In 1971, he suggested to the other Ray Charles that he perform "America the Beautiful" when a guest on the Campbell show. Also that year Charles wrote special material for the first Julie Andrews TV special, with Andrews and Gene Kelly.

Charles became the musical guru to Sha Na Na and guided that show through three seasons. His son, Jonathan, and daughter, Wendy, also worked on the show with their father. Charles, duetting with Julia Rinker, sang the title theme song for the long-running situation comedy Three's Company.

The Muppets and Kennedy Center 

Charles eventually went to London to help on The Muppet Show. Writing special material for Carol Burnett and Brooke Shields, among others and working with Miss Piggy and Kermit the Frog, Charles shared an office with Jim Henson, whom Charles considered "a genius".

For 32 years, 1982 through 2014, Charles was the musical consultant of the Kennedy Center Honors and for 14 years performed the same function for the "Fourth of July" and "Memorial Day" concerts on PBS.

Ray Charles won two Emmy Awards for special musical material, music and lyrics for two comedy specials: The Funny Side of Marriage and The First Nine Months. His choral anthem, "Fifty Nifty United States", in which he set the names of the states to music in alphabetical order, is now a staple of school choirs.

He self-deprecatingly billed himself as "the other Ray Charles" in a humorous tribute to the blues singer with whom he worked on several occasions. It was sometimes said that there were two Ray Charles'. One was blind and the other was deaf.

For his 90th birthday, Ray gave a concert at the L.A. Jazz Bakery. With the help of female singer Lynn Roberts and an instrumental combo, Ray demonstrated his vocal longevity to a full house by singing his way through the songs of World War II.

Death 

Charles died of cancer at the age of 96 on April 6, 2015, in Beverly Hills, California.  He was survived by two sons, Michael (born 1941) and Jonathan (born 1946).  His wife Bernice (19162002) and daughter Wendy (19502004) predeceased him.

Charles donated a collection of his personal papers, including his scripts and musical arrangements for the Kennedy Center Honors galas, to the Great American Songbook Foundation shortly before his death.

Awards 

 197071 Television Academy Award Lyrics and Special Material "The First Nine Months are the Hardest"
 197172 Television Academy Award Lyrics and Special Material "The Funny Side of Marriage"
 2004 Irwin Kostal Tribute Award from ASMAC.
 2012 Honored as a Broadcasting Legend by the Pacific Pioneers.
 2013 Foundation Life in Music Award from ASCAP.

Discography

Singles

Albums as the Ray Charles Singers 

 I Love Essex ESLP 103
 Far Away Places Essex ESLP 110
 Spring Is Here MGM E3162
 Winter Wonderland MGM 3387
 Sing A Song of Paris MGM E3484
 Here We Come A-Caroling MGM E3467
 Here's to My Lady MGM E3568
 Autumn Moods MGM SE4163
 Summertime (Songs for a Lazy Afternoon) MGM E4164
 Love and Marriage Decca DL8787
 Sunrise Serenade Decca DL78835
 In the Evening By the Moonlight Decca DL78874
 We Gather Together Decca DL78940
 Deep Night Decca DL78988
 Something Wonderful Command RS 33 872 1961
 Something Special for Young Lovers Command RS 866 SD
 Al-Di-La & Other Special Songs for Young Lovers  Command RS 33–870 SD 1964
 Rome Revisited Command RS 839 SD
 Songs for Lonesome Lovers Command RS 839 SD
 Songs for Latin Lovers Command RS 886 SD 1965
 Paradise Islands Command SH-165
 Young Lovers on Broadway Command RS 890 SD 1965
 One of Those Songs Command RS 898 SD 1966
 What the World Needs Now is Love Command RS 903 SD
 A Special Something...   Command RS 914 SD 1967
 At the Movies Command RS 921 SD 1968
 MacArthur Park   Command RS SD-936 1969
 Move Me, Oh Wondrous Music Command RS 949-5
 Take Me Along Command RS 526 SD
 Slices of Life Command 9425
 Love Me With All Your Heart the command performance'' Varèse Sarabande VSD-5626 (CD collection)
 31 albums with Perry Como

Singles 
 Command-4049Al-Di-La/'Til The End of Time1964
 Command-4090Don't Cry-There's No Place Like Rome1967

References

External links 

 
 
 
 Ray Charles Papers at the Great American Songbook Foundation
 Ray Charles Interview NAMM Oral History Library (1995)

1918 births
2015 deaths
American classical musicians
American conductors (music)
American male conductors (music)
American male singers
American male songwriters
American music arrangers
Aurora University alumni
Classical musicians from Illinois
Deaths from cancer in California
Decca Records artists
Easy listening musicians
Emmy Award winners
MGM Records artists
RCA Victor artists
Singers from Chicago
Songwriters from Illinois
United States Navy personnel of World War II